The Taurus Model 689 is a double action/single action .357 magnum revolver produced in Brazil by Taurus (manufacturer). The Taurus 689 was produced from 19881998. It is DA/SA action.  The Taurus 669 model is essentially identical but has a non-vented barrel rib.

History

The Taurus Model 689 was a 6-round .357 Magnum double action revolver that began production in 1989. The 689 weighs 1.56 lbs (0.71 kg) with a four-inch barrel. A six-inch barrel variant was also offered. Taurus wanted to make a .357 magnum revolver to most likely appeal to the police forces in Brazil at the time. Design-wise, it is very similar to the revered Smith & Wesson Model 686. The Model 689 stayed in production for about 10 years and then Taurus stopped producing the revolver. The Model 689 was also seen in various films.

Legacy

Even long after production of the 689 ceased, Taurus to this day still produces revolvers of various calibers, some of which resemble the Model 689.

A Model 689 with a custom barrel was used by "Man #4" in the Quentin Tarantino movie Pulp Fiction. Vincent Vega's description of it was the first usage of the term "hand cannon" to describe a very large or powerful gun.

References

Taurus revolvers